The 2011 Irish Baseball League season began on Saturday, April 2, and ran through Saturday, August 27. This is the  15th edition of the Irish Baseball League. 

The opening game of the Irish Baseball League was played at Shanganah Park in Dublin between Greystones Mariners and Dublin Spartans. The match ended Dublin Spartans 9 - 8 Greystones Mariners. The plate umpire for the match was Massimo Lepri.

Venues

Standings

Irish Baseball League

Irish Baseball League
baseball
Irish Baseball League